Shanta Pinnacle is a  40-floor commercial skyscraper in Tejgaon, Dhaka, which is currently under construction. Upon completion, The Pinnacle is set to be the second tallest building in the city, and its first 40-floor building. 

The tower was approved for construction in September 2018, and is scheduled to be completed by December 2026. The tower is owned by Shanta Holdings Limited. The skyscraper is the first in Dhaka to undergo a wind tunnel test, and has a design by local firm EK Architects. It is designed as a LEED-certified green building, with a double-glazed unitised facade system for energy efficiency and an intelligent Building Management System.

See also
 List of tallest buildings in Bangladesh
 List of tallest buildings in Dhaka
 List of tallest buildings and structures in the Indian subcontinent
 List of tallest buildings and structures in the world by country

References

External links
 Shanta Pinnacle

Buildings and structures in Dhaka
Skyscraper office buildings in Bangladesh
Central business districts in Bangladesh
Economy of Dhaka